Fishbowl Worldwide Media is an independent production company with a focus on transmedia development and production. Founded in 2010 and headquartered in Los Angeles, California, it was founded by Vin Di Bona (a television producer known for MacGyver, Entertainment Tonight, and America's Funniest Home Videos) and Bruce Gersh (previously senior vice president, Strategy and Operations of Intellectual Property at the William Morris Agency).

About the company
FishBowl Worldwide Media utilizes partnerships with other entertainment companies (NBC, Fox, Discovery Channel, MTV and truTV) as well as its own internal teams to create original content for film, television, digital platforms, and several brands. FishBowl operates by turning each of its projects into specific brands aimed at engaging its audience. In 2012, Fishbowl launched two YouTube channels called Petsami and CuteWinFail. Fishbowl also manages a curated library of cleared, user-generated content for use by third parties.

Sexual harassment lawsuits
In March 2019, DiBona's two production companies, Vin Di Bona Entertainment, Inc. and Fishbowl Worldwide Media, Inc., along with individual defendant Phil Shafran, were sued for sexual harassment, sexual assault, and retaliation by three former female employees. The lawsuit, Case No. 19STCV09487 is pending in Los Angeles Superior Court.

List of FishBowl Worldwide Media productions

Television shows
 Offbeat 
 Beyond Repair
 Learn Just Enough to get Laid
 Everything you know is Pong
 Upload with Shaquille O'Neal
 America's Funniest Home Videos: Animal Edition

Digital networks
 Petsami
 AFV

Digital shows
 Ultimate Surprises
 CuteWinFail
 Lindo Victoria Fracaso
 Stunt Nation

References

External links
Official website

Television production companies of the United States
Internet television channels
Privately held companies based in California